James Henry Roxburgh (1858–1934), was a professional baseball player who played catcher in the Major Leagues from 1884 to 1887.

External links

1858 births
1934 deaths
Major League Baseball catchers
Baltimore Orioles (AA) players
Philadelphia Athletics (AA) players
19th-century baseball players
San Francisco Eagles players
Augusta Browns players
Binghamton Crickets (1880s) players
Sacramento Altas players
Baseball players from California
Hamilton (minor league baseball) players